The Shire of Kilcoy was a local government area in South East Queensland, Australia, about  northwest of Brisbane along the D'Aguilar Highway, not far from the Sunshine Coast.

Beef cattle is the predominant industry in the area, with other activities including dairying, small crops and aquaculture.

History

The area was originally incorporated as part of the Caboolture Division on 11 November 1879 under the Divisional Boards Act 1879. With the passage of the Local Authorities Act 1902, Caboolture became a Shire on 31 March 1903.

On 22 February 1912, the Shire of Kilcoy split away and was proclaimed in its own right. The council consisted of an elected mayor and eight councillors, and was not subdivided.

On 15 March 2008, under the Local Government (Reform Implementation) Act 2007 passed by the Parliament of Queensland on 10 August 2007, the Shire of Kilcoy merged with the Shire of Esk to form the Somerset Region.

Towns and localities
The Shire of Kilcoy included the following settlements:

 Kilcoy
 Glenfern
 Hazeldean
 Jimna
 Monsildale
 Villeneuve
 Winya
 Yabba
 Yendina

Population

Chairmen and mayors
1927: R. C. Jenkinson 
 1985-2000: Alex Brown 
 2000-2008: Terry Dredge

References

Former local government areas of Queensland
Somerset Region
2008 disestablishments in Australia
Populated places disestablished in 2008